Ilie Poenaru (born 11 November 1976) is a Romanian professional football manager and former football player who played as a left-back.

Club career
Poenaru started his professional career at Steaua București, but he did not appear in an official game for the club. Poenaru made his Liga I debut on 19 February 2002, for Politehnica Timișoara, in a 1–3 defeat against Farul Constanța. In his career Ilie played mostly for Politehnica Timișoara and Argeș Pitești with short periods spent at Metalul Plopeni, FC Gloria Buzău and Concordia Chiajna.

Managerial career
After retirement, Poenaru started his football manager career and coached teams such as: Inter Clinceni, Voluntari or Dinamo București U-19. In January 2018, he was appointed as manager of Liga II club Academica Clinceni.

Honours

Player
Fulgerul Bragadiru
Divizia B: 2001–02
Divizia C: 1999–2000

Argeș Pitești
Liga II: 2007–08

Coach
Voluntari
Liga II: 2014–15

References

External links
 
 

1976 births
Living people
Footballers from Bucharest
Romanian footballers
Association football defenders
Liga I players
Liga II players
FC Steaua București players
CSO Plopeni players
FC Politehnica Timișoara players
FC Gloria Buzău players
FC Argeș Pitești players
CS Concordia Chiajna players
Romanian football managers
Liga I managers
Liga II managers
FC Voluntari managers
LPS HD Clinceni managers
CS Gaz Metan Mediaș managers
FC UTA Arad managers